Richard Baxter (1615–1691) was an English Puritan church leader, poet, hymn-writer, theologian, and controversialist.

Richard Baxter may also refer to:
 Richard Baxter (actor) (c. 1593–c. 1667), English actor
 Richard Baxter (rugby union) (born 1978), English rugby union player
 Richard Xavier Baxter (1821–1904), Roman Catholic priest and Jesuit
 Richard Reeve Baxter (1921–1980), American jurist

See also 
 Baxter (disambiguation)